"I Still Believe" is a song by German recording artist Juliette Schoppmann. It was written by Jörgen Elofsson, John Reid, and Per Åström and recorded by Schoppmann for her debut studio album, Unique (2004). Production was overseen by Peter Ries. Released in January 2004 as the album's third and final single, the ballad became Uniques highest-charting single when it peaked at number nine on the German Singles Chart. As of 2018, it remain's Schoppmann's biggest hit.

Track listings

Charts

References

External links
 

2004 singles
2004 songs
Songs written by Jörgen Elofsson
Bertelsmann Music Group singles
Songs written by Peer Åström